Mass media in Malawi consist of several different types of communications media: television, radio, cinema, newspapers, magazines and Internet-based Web sites. Malawi also has a growing music industry. Media is either privately owned or government owned.

Radio

Malawian radio broadcasts in two bands: FM, AM. National Radio stations include MBC 1 and MBC2 that are run by Malawi Broadcasting Corporation. Privately owned radio station includes Zodiak Broadcasting Station, and Capital Radio Malawi. The Malawi Communications Regulatory Authority (MACRA) has recently issued licenses to new radio broadcasters to expand radio offerings in Malawi. This includes Matindi, GoodNews, and Mwadama.

Television

Television in Malawi is regulated by MACRA.Though Malawi Television penetration is low. The country boasts 20 television stations by 2016 broadcasting on the countries  digital  network MDBNL, e.g. This includes Times Group, Timveni, Adventist, and Beta.

Motion pictures

The motion picture industry in Malawi is in its infancy but there have been a few developments over the years that have given rise to film festival and individual films. There is a Malawi International Film festival that began in 2009. The most well known director has been Shemu Joyah is a producer and film maker from Malawi who produced Seasons of a life. Malawi's most well known actors include Michael Usi and Tapiwa Gwaza.
Cinema can be viewed at indoor movie cinemas or at the drive-in movie cinema.

Newspapers

The Malawi News Agency (MANA) is the largest news network in Malawi. It was established in 1966 to provide and produce news content to the country from the government. It also gathers news from around the country. Its online news content launched in 2012.

The oldest privately owned newspaper in the nation is The Daily Times. The widest circulated national papers are The Daily Times and The Nation. Both are sold in most Malawian cities. Many of the newspapers have also branched out online and have online versions with credible content.

There has also been a growth of online newspapers. This includes privately funded papers owned by Malawians in the Diaspora such as Leeds, England based Nyasatimes, Atlanta, US based Maravi Post and Blantyre-based Malawi24.

Magazines

Malawi has both English language and Chichewa magazines that circulate nationally, regionally or within a city.

Social media
There has been an increase in Malawians on social media, particularly on Twitter, Facebook. There has been a steady growth of Malawian bloggers as well. Social Media has been an important tool for transparency in Malawi. It has been linked to influencing the outcome of the constitutional crisis in 2012.

See also
Communications in Malawi
 List of Malawian writers

References

Bibliography

External links
MACRA Online

 
Malawi
Malawi